The 26th Punjabis were an infantry regiment of the British Indian Army. It was raised in 1857, as the 18th Regiment of Punjab Infantry. It was designated as the 26th Punjabis in 1903 and became 2nd Battalion 15th Punjab Regiment in 1922. In 1947, it was allocated to the Pakistan Army, where it continues to exist as 10th Battalion The Punjab Regiment.

Early history
The regiment was raised by Captain HT Bartlett at Peshawar in June 1857, as the 18th Regiment of Punjab Infantry, during the upheaval of the Indian Mutiny. The manpower consisted of Pathans, Punjabi Muslims, Sikhs and Dogras. The regiment took part in the Bhutan War of 1864–66, the Second Afghan War of 1878–80 and the Third Anglo-Burmese War of 1885–87. In 1895, it took part in the Relief of Chitral, while in 1897, it operated with the Mohmand Field Force during the great tribal uprising on the North West Frontier of India.

26th Punjabis
Subsequent to the reforms brought about in the Indian Army by Lord Kitchener in 1903, the regiment's designation was changed to 26th Punjabis.

In 1911, the 26th Punjabis moved to Hong Kong to protect British interests following the Chinese Revolution of 1911. On the outbreak of the First World War, the regiment returned from Hong Kong to India. In December 1915, it sailed for Mesopotamia. During 1916, it fought on the Tigris Front in the Battles of Dujaila and Sannaiyat, as the British made desperate efforts to relieve their besieged garrison at Kut al Amara. In 1917, the regiment was again engaged in fighting on the River Tigris and took part in the British advance on Baghdad. In 1918, it moved to Persia, returning to India in October 1919. In 1918, the 26th Punjabis raised a second battalion, which was disbanded in 1922.

Subsequent history
In 1921–22, a major reorganization was undertaken in the British Indian Army leading to the formation of large infantry groups of four to six battalions. Among these was the 15th Punjab Regiment, formed by grouping the 26th Punjabis  with the 25th, 27th, 28th and 29th Punjabis. The battalion's new designation was 2nd Battalion 15th Punjab Regiment. During the Second World War, the battalion fought in Borneo, where it was captured by the Japanese in March 1942. It was re-raised in 1946 as a Machine-Gun Battalion. In 1947, the 15th Punjab Regiment was allocated to Pakistan Army. In 1956, it was merged with the 1st, 14th and 16th Punjab Regiments to form one large Punjab Regiment, and 2/15th Punjab was redesignated as 10 Punjab. The battalion fought in Kashmir during the 1948 war with India. During the 1965 Indo-Pakistan War, it fought at Suleimanki, while in 1971, it served in the Rajasthan Sector.

Genealogy

1857 The Peshawar Punjab Battalion
1857 18th Regiment of Punjab Infantry
1861 30th Regiment of Bengal Native Infantry
1861 26th Regiment of Bengal Native Infantry
1864 26th (Punjab) Regiment of Bengal Native Infantry
1885 26th (Punjab) Regiment of Bengal Infantry
1901 26th Punjab Infantry
1903 26th Punjabis
1918 1st Battalion 25th Punjabis
1922 2nd Battalion 15th Punjab Regiment
1956 10th Battalion The Punjab Regiment

References

Further reading
Stoney, Lt PS. (1924). A History of the 26th Punjabis, 1857–1923. Aldershot: Gale & Polden.
Rizvi, Brig SHA. (1984). Veteran Campaigners – A History of the Punjab Regiment 1759–1981. Lahore: Wajidalis.
Cardew, Lt FG. (1903). A Sketch of the Services of the Bengal Native Army to the Year 1895. Calcutta: Military Department.

See also
15th Punjab Regiment
Punjab Regiment

British Indian Army infantry regiments
Honourable East India Company regiments
Punjab Regiment (Pakistan)
Military units and formations established in 1857
1857 establishments in India